Lilla Barzó (born 2 September 1996) is a Hungarian former tennis player.

Barzó won three singles titles on the ITF Women's Circuit in her career. On 26 October 2015, she reached her best singles ranking of world No. 435. On 13 April 2015, she peaked at No. 704 in the WTA doubles rankings.

Barzó was given a wildcard for the 2013 Budapest Grand Prix, where she made her WTA Tour main-draw debut, alongside Dalma Gálfi in doubles, only to lose to the 2011 French Open doubles champions Andrea Hlaváčková and Lucie Hradecká.

Barzó played her last match on the ITF Circuit in March 2016.

After her retirement, she started to studying at the University of Szeged.

ITF finals

Singles (3–2)

Doubles (0–2)

References

External links
 
 

1996 births
Living people
Hungarian female tennis players
21st-century Hungarian women